
Gmina Siedlce is a rural gmina (administrative district) in Siedlce County, Masovian Voivodeship, in east-central Poland. Its seat is the town of Siedlce, although the town is not part of the territory of the gmina.

Villages
Gmina Siedlce contains the villages and settlements of Białki, Biel, Błogoszcz, Chodów, Golice, Golice-Kolonia, Grabianów, Grubale, Jagodnia, Joachimów, Nowe Iganie, Nowe Opole, Opole Świerczyna, Osiny, Ostrówek, Pruszyn, Pruszyn-Pieńki, Pruszynek, Purzec, Pustki, Rakowiec, Stare Iganie, Stare Opole, Stok Lacki, Stok Lacki-Folwark, Strzała, Topórek, Ujrzanów, Wólka Leśna, Wołyńce, Wołyńce-Kolonia, Żabokliki, Żabokliki-Kolonia, Żelków-Kolonia and Żytnia.

Neighbouring gminas
Gmina Siedlce is bordered by the city of Siedlce and by the gminas of Kotuń, Mokobody, Mordy, Skórzec, Sokołów Podlaski, Suchożebry, Wiśniew and Zbuczyn.

References

Polish official population figures 2006

Siedlce
Siedlce County